Bargeh is a village in Gahrbaran-e Shomali Rural District, Gahrbaran District, Miandorud County, Mazandaran Province, Iran. At the 2006 census, its population was 1,648, in 464 families.

References 

Populated places in Miandorud County